Burr is a masculine given name which may refer to the following people:

Burr Baldwin (1922-2007), American college and professional football player
Burr Caswell (1807–1896), American frontiersman
Burr Chamberlain (1877–1933), American college football player and head coach
Burr DeBenning (1936–2003), American character actor
Burr H. Duval (1809–1836), the commander of the Kentucky Mustangs, a volunteer unit which fought in the Texas Revolution
Burr Harrison (1904-1973), American politician
Burr W. Jones (1846–1935), American politician, jurist and lawyer
Burr McIntosh (1862–1942), American lecturer, photographer, film studio owner, silent film actor, author, publisher of Burr McIntosh Monthly, reporter and a pioneer in the early film and radio business
Burr Plato (c. 1844–1905), escaped African-American slave and Canadian politician
Burr Shafer (1899–1965), American cartoonist
Burr Steers (born 1965), American actor, screenwriter and director, nephew of writer Gore Vidal
Burr Tillstrom (1917-1985), American puppeteer, creator and sole puppeteer of the television show Kukla, Fran and Ollie
Burr Williams (1909–1981), American National Hockey League player

Masculine given names